Ng'endo Mwangi was Kenya's first woman physician. She set up clinics serving a very large rural population. She was born in Kenya and studied in the United States.

Born in Kinoo, Kiambu to  Rahab Wambui Mwangi and Mwangi Muchiri, she attended Loreto High school Limuru as part of its pioneer class. Mwangi was enabled to study in the United States under the Kennedy Airlifts program and she became the first black African woman to attend Smith College in Massachusetts. She graduated from Smith College in 1961, after which she became the first African student at Albert Einstein College of Medicine in New York City. Returning to Kenya as a qualified physician, she opened her first practice, the Athi River Clinic, in an arid rural region southeast of Nairobi where she was the only doctor for over 300,000 Maasai people. In 1987 she founded the Reto Medical Center at Sultan Hamud.

Members of the Black Students Alliance at Smith College made the case for additional facilities on campus and, in 1973, the Mwangi Cultural Center was established and named in her honor. At that time the center was located at Lilly Hall but it later was moved to the Davis Center at Smith College.
Mwangi formally changed her name from Florence Gladwell in 1967. She was awarded an honorary degree by Smith College in 1987.  She died of breast cancer in 1989.

References

1989 deaths
Kenyan general practitioners
Smith College alumni
Kenyan women physicians
Albert Einstein College of Medicine alumni
20th-century Kenyan physicians